This is a partial index of Wikipedia articles treating natural languages, arranged alphabetically and with (sub-) families mentioned. The list also includes extinct languages.

For a published list of languages, see ISO 639-1 (list of ISO 639-1 codes for 136 major languages), or for a more inclusive list, see ISO 639-3 (list of ISO 639-3 codes, 7,874 in total as of June 2013). The enumeration of languages and dialects can easily be taken into the five-digit range; the Linguasphere Observatory has a database (LS-2010) with more than 32,800 coded entries and more than 70,900 linguistic names.

List

See also

 Constructed language and List of constructed languages
 Language (for information about language in general)
 Language observatory
 Languages used on the Internet
 List of fictional languages
 List of programming languages
 Lists of languages
 Sign language and List of sign languages

References

Wikipedia indexes